Mala Stara Vas is a settlement in the Municipality of Grosuplje in central Slovenia. The area is part of the historical region of Lower Carniola. The municipality is now included in the Central Slovenia Statistical Region. 

The village church is dedicated to Saint Catherine and dates originally to the 12th century with 14th- and 17th-century additions.

References

External links

Mala Stara Vas on Geopedia

Populated places in the Municipality of Grosuplje